Haptolina is a genus of haptophytes belonging to the family Prymnesiaceae.

The genus has cosmopolitan distribution.

Species:

Haptolina brevifila 
Haptolina ericina 
Haptolina fragaria 
Haptolina herdlensis 
Haptolina hirta

References

Haptophyte genera